"Live to Tell" is a song by American singer Madonna from her third studio album True Blue (1986). The song was originally composed by Patrick Leonard as an instrumental for the score of Paramount's film Fire with Fire, but Paramount rejected it. Leonard then presented the track to Madonna, who decided to use it for At Close Range, a film starring her then-husband Sean Penn. Madonna wrote the lyrics, co-composed the melodies and co-produced it with Leonard. "Live to Tell" was released as True Blues lead single on March 26, 1986, by Sire Records; afterwards, it was included on Madonna's compilation albums The Immaculate Collection (1990), Something to Remember (1995), and Celebration (2009). A pop ballad, the song includes instrumentation from guitars, keyboards, drums and a synthesizer, while the lyrics deal with deceit, mistrust and childhood scars; Madonna also recalled in an interview that she thought about her relationship with her parents while writing the lyrics. 

Upon release, the song was generally acclaimed by music critics, who frequently referred to it as one of her best ballads. It was also commercially successful, becoming Madonna's third number one in the US Billboard Hot 100, and her first number one on the Adult Contemporary chart. The music video, directed by James Foley, shows the singer in a more demure, toned down appearance, inspired by actresses such as Grace Kelly. "Live to Tell" was included on three of Madonna's concert tours. The performance at 2006's Confessions Tour caused controversy as it had the singer hanging from a mirrored cross simulating a crucifixion; religious groups condemned the number as an act of hostility toward the Roman Catholic Church. Madonna responded saying that her main intention with the performance was to bring attention to the millions of children dying in Africa. "Live to Tell" has been covered by a handful of artists, particularly for tribute albums.

Background and release 

In 1985, after Madonna concluded The Virgin Tour, she approached producers Patrick Leonard and Stephen Bray and asked them to write some songs with her and produce her third studio album, True Blue (1986). The first songs Madonna and Leonard worked on for the album were "Love Makes The World Go Round" and "Live to Tell". This last one was originally composed as an instrumental by Leonard for the score of Paramount's film Fire with Fire; "my managers represented the guy who was directing [the film]; it was his first film. I saw a little piece [of the film], and I had the script. I wrote a theme and I said, 'what if I could get Madonna to write the lyrics for it?'", Leonard recalled. Paramount, however, rejected the track, believing it was inappropriate for the film, and that Leonard was incapable of creating a proper score; afterwards, Leonard presented the instrumental to Madonna, who decided to use it for At Close Range, the new film starring her then-husband Sean Penn.

Madonna wrote all the lyrics, added some melodies, and composed the bridge. She recorded a demo of the song on a cassette and presented it to the film's director James Foley, who listened to it, liked it and enlisted Leonard to compose the film's score, as suggested by the singer. At the same time, Leonard was working with Michael Jackson on some transcriptions for his album Bad (1987), when he received a phone call from Penn asking him to come to Foley's home. When the producer got there, he was asked by Penn who would sing the track, since it was written from a man's perspective. He decided to use Madonna, and used the vocals from the demo for the final version, adding some backup drums only. Of why he chose to use the demo's vocals, Leonard explained: "it was so innocent and so shy. It's as naive, as raw as can be and that's part of what gave it all its charm". In a 1986 interview, Madonna further added that the mood on the song was inspired by a different facet of her image makeover and her desire to focus on something different. In the United States, "Live to Tell" was released on March 26, 1986, almost three months before True Blue, released on June 30. In Europe, it was released on April 14. Afterwards, it was included on Madonna's compilation albums The Immaculate Collection (1990), Something to Remember (1995), and Celebration (2009).

Composition 

"Live to Tell" is a pop ballad whose background instrumentation features a keyboard, a synthesizer, a funk guitar and a mix of synthesized and real drumming. According to the sheet music published by Alfred Publishing Inc., the song's written in the key of F major, set in common time, and moves at a moderate tempo of 112 beats per minute. It begins with an instrumental introduction, performed by a synthesizer with the bass pedals set on D minor, before the key suddenly changes to its relative major, F. Madonna's vocal range spans almost one octave from F3 to D4. As she begins to sing the first verse, the bass pedal changes to C major, then back to F during the chorus, and back to D minor during the closure. This process is repeated during the second verse and chorus, which abruptly ends in a silence with only the "low and lifeless" sound of the synthesizer, set in D minor. Madonna then starts to sing the bridge "If I ran away, I'd never have the strength" between the tonal keys of D and F, closing with the repetition of the chorus until the song gradually fades out.

Lyrically, "Live to Tell" portrays the complexity of deceit and mistrust; According to authors Freya Jarman-Ivens and Santiago Fouz-Hernández, in Madonna's Drowned Worlds (2004), it is about "childhood scars", and counts with an "extreme" emotional pitch. On another note, Boston.com's Scott Kearnan added that it's about "bearing the burden of some enigmatic secret and coping with a painful past", while Nick Levine from Digital Spy argued that it was about child abuse. Dave Marsh wrote on The Heart of Rock & Soul that the archetype of songs like "Live to Tell" is The Platters' "The Great Pretender" (1965). In an interview about the song, Madonna herself revealed the lyrics talk about "my relationship with my parents and the lying that went on. The song is about being strong, and questioning whether you can be that strong but ultimately surviving".

Critical reception 

Upon release, "Live to Tell" was generally acclaimed by music critics. Stephen Thomas Erlewine, for Allmusic, called it a "tremendous" ballad that "rewrites the rules of adult contemporary crossover"; from the same website, Stewart Mason deemed it "unlike anything Madonna had recorded up to that point", and said it proved "[she]'s a genuinely talented singer [...] one of her all-time strongest vocal performances". Jim Farber, from Entertainment Weekly, referred to it as "her best ballad to date". Adam Sexton wrote in Desperately Seeking Madonna: In Search Of The Meaning Of The World's Most Famous Woman, that "Live to Tell" made a "provocative companion" to "Papa Don't Preach", True Blues second single; "[Madonna] appropriately measured the safety of silence against the urge to unburden herself". Sexton also complimented the production, saying that the "music itself suggests a threatened annihilation, a fact that makes it more haunting". Allen Metz and Carol Benson, authors of The Madonna Companion: Two Decades of Commentary, felt it "expanded" the singer's musical horizons; they added that "Live to Tell" was a "compelling" track, in which Madonna sings with "moving conviction". J. Randy Taraborrelli, author of Madonna: An Intimate Biography, was pleased with the track, denoting it as a "vehicle of growth" for the artist. Rolling Stones Davitt Sigerson was not impressed and dismissed it as a "'Both Sides Now' rewrite".

Writing for PopMatters, Peter Piatkowski said it was a "simultaneously cold and emotional" song, filled with "maturity and ambition", as well as a "very deliberate effort to present Madonna as a mature and serious artist". On her review of True Blue for Yahoo!, Stacy Mannion classified "Live to Tell" as a "powerful [...] strange, but beautiful" ballad  with a "bluesy feel". Erika Wexler from Spin, described it as "dark and moody, dense with dramatic mystery", and highlighted the way in which the singer "very theatrically conveys a dreamy fatalism". According to Slants Sal Cinquemani, the song was "not only a brave first single, but a statement in and of itself. ['Live to Tell'] rewrote the rules of what a lead single could sound like". While reviewing The Immaculate Collection on its 25th anniversary, Peoples Drew Mackie said it was "easily one of Madonna’s better ballads". For Edna Gundersen from USA Today, it's a "moody heart-tugger" that "may be her best song ever". On his review of Something to Remember, J. D. Considine, for The Baltimore Sun, noted that "[Madonna] does it all through phrasing, pushing ahead of the accompaniment at some points and dragging behind the beat at others to reflect the character's emotional turmoil". For Stereogum, Tom Breihan noted that "as a singer, Madonna has never been a powerhouse like Whitney Houston, but she’s a communicator. She speaks volumes with tone and phrasing [...] ['Live to Tell'] takes the sound of big mid-’80s pop and somehow makes it intimate".  Cash Box called it a "restrained yet emotionally powerful ballad."

Retrospective reviews towards "Live to Tell" have been largely positive, and it is now considered one of Madonna's best songs. For Parade, Samuel R. Murrian considered it to be the singer's "finest, most emotional ballad" that has "her strongest-ever lyrics", as well her third best song. Jude Rogers, from The Guardian, named it her ninth greatest song, highlighting its lyrics and referring to it as "the best thing Madonna’s done in cinema, despite the mediocrity of the film that it’s from". For Glamours Christopher Rosa it's Madonna's sixth best; "a melodramatic shot of emotion that highlights her signature throaty vocals". Andrew Unterberger for Billboard, and Chuck Arnold for Entertainment Weekly, placed it at number 18 and 17 of their rankings of Madonna's singles, respectively; the former named it "the first truly great Madonna ballad", while according to the latter, it found her "displaying greater depth and maturity than ever before". Scott Kearnan considered "Live to Tell" Madonna's 21st best single and wrote: "With 'Crazy for You', [Madonna] proved she could nail a hit ballad: for teenage girls to slow dance to at prom. But 'Live to Tell' broadened her appeal with adult audiences". Sal Cinquemani deemed it the artist's fifth best: "[Her] first and, arguably, most dramatic reinvention was scored by this spare and haunting ballad", that also includes one of her "richest" vocal performances.

Chart performance 

On April 12, 1986, Billboard reported that "Live to Tell" was one of the most added songs on radio stations, which gave it an "outstanding" debut on the Hot 100 at number 49. One week later, it debuted at number 28 on both the Hot Adult Contemporary and Hot 100 Airplay charts. On May 10, it was reported that "Live to Tell" was the single with the most airplay in reporting radio stations, 229 out of 230; seven days later, it became Madonna's seventh consecutive top-five single. On June 7, "Live to Tell" reached the top of the Hot 100, becoming Madonna's third chart-topper; it spent one week in this position. "Live to Tell" was Madonna's third number-one in less than 18 months, as well as her second one taken from a movie, following "Crazy for You". The song also became a crossover success, topping the Hot Adult Contemporary chart for three weeks. On Billboards Top Pop Singles and Top Dance Sales Singles year-end charts, "Live to Tell" peaked at number 35 and 37, respectively. On the year-end Adult Contemporary chart, the song was ranked at number 12. In Canada, the single debuted at number 79 of the RPM singles chart, the week of April 12, 1986. Eventually, "Live to Tell" peaked at number one the week of May 24. It was ranked at the second position of the 1986 RPM Singles year-end chart.

In the United Kingdom, the single debuted at number 10 on the Singles Chart on April 26, eventually peaking at number two behind Falco's "Rock Me Amadeus"; it remained in the chart for a total of 12 weeks. One month later, it was certified silver by the British Phonographic Industry (BPI) for shipment of 331,000 copies. According to Music Week magazine, over 271,897 copies of the single have been sold in the United Kingdom as of 2008. "Live to Tell" also saw success throughout Europe: it reached the first position in Italy and Greece, where it became the best-selling single; in Ireland and Norway, the single peaked at number two; in Belgium, Denmark, and the Netherlands, "Live to Tell" reached the third position of the charts. In France, the single reached the chart's sixth position, and was certified silver by the Syndicat National de l'Édition Phonographique for shipment of 250,000 copies. In New Zealand and Australia, the song peaked at number 7 and 6, respectively.

Music video 

The music video for "Live to Tell" was directed by James Foley and used as a publicity campaign for At Close Range; it alternates shots of Madonna singing alone in a darkened room with scenes from the movie that, according to Jeremy G. Butler in Television: critical methods and applications (2002), indicate the conflict Sean Penn's character goes through and feels. After having starred in the film Shanghai Surprise, Madonna decided to tone down her appearance, inspired by actresses such as Grace Kelly and Brigitte Bardot, and held this look for the music video. Her make-up was "heavy but very tasteful"; her hair "elegant", shoulder-length, wavy and golden blond; her clothes consisted of a simple, "demure" 1930s-style floral dress. It was her first music video to not feature dance routine, but a "tinge of real-world storytelling", showing her as a narrator.

Jeffrey F. Keuss, author of Your Neighbor's Hymnal: What Popular Music Teaches Us about Faith, Hope, and Love (2011), wrote that "there is something in that loneliness [from the video] that makes it feel like the most authentic thing [Madonna] has ever done", comparing the shots of her singing alone to Carl Theodor Dreyer's 1928 film The Passion of Joan of Arc, and the cover artwork for Sinéad O'Connor's second studio album I Do Not Want What I Haven't Got (1990). Butler added that, through her singing, Madonna appears to speak to Penn's character, addressing his problems directly like the chorus of a classical tragedy. Peter Piatkowski gave a positive review of the clip, describing it as "gorgeous and stylish", feeling it "matched the song’s intense moodiness". Tom Breihan said it was the only video in which the singer "gives as much screen time to a mustachioed Christopher Walken as it does to [herself]", and that it displayed one of her "many image reinventions". It was considered Madonna's 17th best music video by Samuel R. Murrian, and can be found on the 2009 video compilation Celebration: The Video Collection.

Live performances and controversy 

Madonna has performed "Live to Tell" on three of her concert tours: Who's That Girl (1987), Blond Ambition (1990) and Confessions (2006). On the first one, she sang the song standing motionless in a single spotlight, dressed in a black ensemble with tassels, golden tips and ribbing, designed by Marlene Stewart. For the Los Angeles Times, Robert Hilburn noted that the artist sang "with a delicate, embracing feeling that few of even her biggest fans would have imagined possible five years ago". Two different performances can be found on the videos Who's That Girl: Live in Japan, filmed in Tokyo on June, and Ciao Italia: Live from Italy, filmed in Turin on September.

For the Blond Ambition World Tour, it was performed in a medley with "Oh Father" from Like a Prayer (1989), and given a Catholic theme: the stage was set up to resemble a cathedral with votive candles, while Madonna wore black vestments and sang knelt down in a prie-dieu. On his review of the Uniondale concert, Jon Pareles from The New York Times praised the singer's "throaty" vocals during the number. Three different performances can be found in Blond Ambition Japan Tour 90, taped in Yokohama, Blond Ambition World Tour Live, taped in Nice, and in the documentary Madonna: Truth or Dare.

On the Confessions Tour, Madonna sang "Live to Tell" hanging from a mirrored cross, simulating a crucifixion; her outfit consisted of purple pants, a red blouse and a crown of thorns. The screen behind her showed a running tally of the number 12,000,000, and "dire" statistics about children dying of AIDS in Africa. The number generated a negative reaction from religious groups: German prosecutors in Düsseldorf threatened to sue the singer for blasphemy, while the performance done at Rome's Olympic Stadium —located near the Vatican— was condemned as an act of hostility toward the Roman Catholic Church. A spokesperson for the Catholic Church in England and Wales said believers would be offended by the number; "the crucifixion is at the heart of the story of God becoming man and suffering to redeem us. To use it as a stage prop is a banal perversion of that magnificent event". Madonna stood by the number, claiming that Jesus wouldn't be mad at "the message I’m trying to send", and elaborated in a statement:
"There is a segment in my show where three of my dancers 'confess' or share harrowing experiences from their childhood that they ultimately overcame. My 'confession' follows and takes place on a Crucifix that I ultimately come down from. This is not a mocking of the church. It is no different than a person wearing a Cross or 'Taking Up the Cross' as it says in the Bible. My performance is neither anti-Christian, sacrilegious or blasphemous. Rather, it is my plea to the audience to encourage mankind to help one another and to see the world as a unified whole. I believe in my heart that if Jesus were alive today he would be doing the same thing.

My specific intent is to bring attention to the millions of children in Africa who are dying every day, and are living without care, without medicine and without hope. I am asking people to open their hearts and minds to get involved in whatever way they can. The song ends with a quote from the Bible's Book of Matthew: 'For I was hungry and you gave me food. I was naked and you gave me clothing. I was sick and you took care of me and God replied, 'Whatever you did for the least of my brothers... you did it to me.'

Please do not pass judgment without seeing my show".
Despite the controversy, critical reception towards the number ranged from lukewarm to negative; Leslie Gray Streeter, from The Palm Beach Post, who gave the overall concert a positive review, opined that it "slowed down, in an unsatisfying way" in "preachy" performances such as "Live to Tell".  Writing for The Chicago Tribune, Greg Kot opined that "now that everyone from Kanye West to Madonna way back in the '80s has flirted with this particular brand of sacrilege, crucifixion just isn't what it used to be in the Shock and Awe department". The staff from The Philadelphia Inquirer panned the number for being "disappointingly static" and a "most desperate attempt to shock". The performance from the August 15-16 London concerts was included on the singer's live album The Confessions Tour (2007).

Covers 

In 1992, American guitarist Bill Frisell covered "Live to Tell" in his fourth album, Have a Little Faith. Six years later Blonde Ambition released an EP with 6 different hi-NRG remixes of the single. New wave band Berlin covered "Live to Tell" for 1999's Virgin Voices: A Tribute to Madonna, Vol. 1; during an interview with CNN, the band's lead vocalist Terri Nunn explained that "[Madonna]'s influenced a lot of people [...] maybe not me, because I'm not a fan. But a lot of bands are", adding that "Live to Tell" is the only song from Madonna that she "would touch". Italian singer Lucrezia made an uptempo dance version of the song that was remixed by David Morales; it peaked at number two for two weeks on Billboards  Hot Dance Club Play and included in the 2001 album Logic Pride, Vol. 4. Canadian jazz singer Carol Welsman recorded "Live to Tell" for her eponymous 2007 album. Other covers of the song on tribute albums include Semi Moore on The Material Girl: A Tribute to Madonna (2000); an instrumental version on The String Quartet Tribute to Madonna (2002); a folk version by Winter Flowers on 2007's Through the Wilderness, and a hi-NRG version by Melissa Totten on her 2008 album Forever Madonna. Tori Amos has also performed the song on many tours throughout her career.

Track listing and formats
 US / Canada / Germany / UK 7" single
 "Live to Tell" (7" Edit) – 4:37
 "Live to Tell" (Instrumental) – 5:49

 US / Canada / Germany / UK 12" Maxi-Single
 "Live to Tell" (LP Version) – 5:49
 "Live to Tell" (7" Edit) – 4:37
 "Live to Tell" (Instrumental) – 5:49

 Germany / UK Reissue CD Maxi-Single (1995)
 "Live to Tell" (LP Version) – 5:49
 "Live to Tell" (7" Edit) – 4:37
 "Live to Tell" (Instrumental) – 5:49

Credits and personnel
 Madonna – lyrics, producer, vocals
 Bruce Gaitsch – guitar
 Patrick Leonard – drum programming, keyboard, producer
 Jonathan Moffett – drums
 Michael Verdick – audio mixing, engineer
 Herb Ritts – photography
 Jeri McManus – design

Credits adapted from the album and 12" single liner notes.

Charts

Weekly charts

Year-end charts

Certifications and sales

References

Bibliography 

 
 
 
 
 
 
 

 
 
 
 

1980s ballads
1986 songs
1986 singles
Billboard Hot 100 number-one singles
Cashbox number-one singles
European Hot 100 Singles number-one singles
Madonna songs
Number-one singles in Italy
Pop ballads
RPM Top Singles number-one singles
Songs written by Patrick Leonard
Songs written by Madonna
Song recordings produced by Madonna
Song recordings produced by Patrick Leonard
Songs written for films
Sire Records singles
Warner Records singles